RHC80267 is an inhibitor of diacylglycerol lipase. Diacylglycerol lipase generates the endocannabinoid 2-arachidonoylglycerol from diacylglycerol.

References

Hydrolase inhibitors